Adithya Srinivasan is an Indian singer. He is best known for his award winning ghazals, and international singles in classical, pop, and world music genres. His notable performances include sharing stage space with Hariharan and opening for Ghulam Ali.

Music career 
Adithya's tribute to 6 ghazals originally rendered by Mehdi Hassan, Jagjit Singh, Hariharan, Ghulam Ali and Pankaj Udhas won him the Singer of the Year Silver Award from Swar Switzerland.

Adithya's first international single, Gham-e-Duniya, written by the Mughal poet Mirza Ghalib, featuring a Miss Universe finalist, earned a 5-star rating on Apple iTunes, and went viral on YouTube.

In 2014, Adithya featured Grammy nominated pianist Jonathan Wesley and flautist Parth Chandiramani for Tu Hi Dilruba, landing a consideration in the 57th Grammy Awards ballot, and a Silver Award in the Southeast Asian VIMA Music Awards.

Adithya collaborated with Massachusetts based composer Sonaljit and Hollywood screen & stage actress Yanna Fabian for Devanke in 2015, landing a consideration in the 58th Grammy Awards ballot, a nomination in the 3rd Radio City Freedom Awards, and a Judge's Special Award in the Southeast Asian VIMA Music Awards.

In 2017, Adithya released Aarzu, an all acoustic ghazal written by Daagh Dehlvi. The single featured musicians from across India, and was mastered by The Beatles’ Grammy winning engineer at the Abbey Road Studios, United Kingdom.

Adithya was featured on Grammy winning composer Laura Sullivan's single 900 Voices.

In 2020, Adithya's music also served as the main theme song in Saad Khan's film Loneliness, based on an account of the prevalent national social distancing during the COVID-19 pandemic.

Corporate career
Adithya studied leadership at Harvard Business School and business analytics at the Singapore Management University. He has worked in strategy and business development. He is also a co-founder of The Red Magnet Ventures.

Discography 
2011: Ghazal Ka Mausam – A Tribute to the Legends
2012: Kaash Aisa Koi Manzur Hota
2013: Gham e Duniya 
2014: Tu Hi Dilruba
2015: Devanke
2016: Signature
2017: Aarzu
2023: Untitled Ghazal

Awards

References

External links 
 Official Website

Male ghazal singers
1992 births
Singapore Management University alumni
Living people